William Bernard Robinson King  (12 November 1889 – 23 January 1963) was a British geologist.

Education
King was educated at the University of Cambridge graduating a first-class Honours degree in geology in 1912

Career
He joined the British Geological Survey (then called the Geological Survey of Great Britain) and distinguished himself on field studies in Wales. In 1914 he was commissioned as a second-lieutenant in the Territorial Army and in 1915 was rapidly trained as a hydrologist and sent to France to assist the Chief Engineer of the British Expeditionary Force establish potable water supplies from boreholes. He has been called "the first British military hydrogeologist"

The most senior of the three military geologists at the start of World War II, Major King was sent to France in 1939. where he later advised on suitable sites for airfields and the D-Day landings. He was awarded a Military Cross in 1940.

In 1943 he became Woodwardian Professor of Geology at the University of Cambridge.

He was elected a Fellow of the Royal Society in 1949. His candidacy document read

Personal life
He was the father of Cuchlaine King

References

Further reading
 Bate, David G.; Morrison, Andrew L. 'Some aspects of the British Geological Survey’s contribution to the war effort at the Western Front, 1914–1918' (Proceedings of the Geologists' Association, Volume 129, Issue 1, 2018, Pages 3–11)
 Rose, E.P.F.; Rosenbaum, M.S. 'British military geologists: the formative years to the end of the First World War' (Proceedings of the Geologists' Association, Volume 104, Issue 1, 1993, Pages 41–49)
 Rose, E.P.F.; Rosenbaum, M.S. 'British military geologists: through the Second World War to the end of the Cold War' (Proceedings of the Geologists' Association, Volume 104, Issue 2, 1993, Pages 95–108)
 Underwood, James R.; Guth, Peter L. (eds) Military Geology in War and Peace (Reviews in Engineering Geology Volume XIII, 1998)

1889 births
1963 deaths
Woodwardian Professors of Geology
Academics of University College London
Alumni of Jesus College, Cambridge
British Army personnel of World War I
20th-century British geologists
Fellows of the Royal Society
Officers of the Order of the British Empire
People educated at Uppingham School
People from Richmondshire (district)
Recipients of the Military Cross
Royal Welch Fusiliers officers
Scientists from Yorkshire